Mohamed Rifai (born 7 August 1939) is an Egyptian former footballer. He competed in the men's tournament at the 1960 Summer Olympics.

References

External links
 
 

1939 births
Living people
Egyptian footballers
Egypt international footballers
Olympic footballers of Egypt
Footballers at the 1960 Summer Olympics
Footballers from Cairo
Association football midfielders
Zamalek SC players
20th-century Egyptian people